Sultonobod is an urban-type settlement in Andijan Region, Uzbekistan. It is part of Qoʻrgʻontepa District. Its population is 20,000 (2016).

References

Populated places in Andijan Region
Urban-type settlements in Uzbekistan